Tæt på (Close by) is the debut album from Danish singer/songwriter Medina.  It was released on 13 September 2007 by At:tack Music. The album was produced by two production teams: Copenhaniacs and Providers, with guest appearances by rappers Joe True and Ruus, and singer Joey Moe.

Tracks

References

Medina (singer) albums
2007 debut albums
Pop albums by Danish artists